WIDE or Wide may refer to:

Wide (cricket)
Wide and narrow data, terms used to describe two different presentations for tabular data
WIDE Project, Widely Integrated Distributed Environment
Wide-angle Infinity Display Equipment
WIDE-LP, a radio station (99.1 FM) licensed to Madison, Wisconsin
Women in Development Europe; see 
 wide (tennis), meaning beyond the sidelines

People with the name Wide
Ernst Wide (1888–1950), a Swedish Olympic long-distance runner
Edvin Wide (1896–1996), a Swedish Olympic long-distance runner
Samuel Wide (1861–1918), a Swedish archaeologist

See also

Widen
Width (disambiguation)